Ruangsak Loychusak, also known as James Ruangsak, is a Thai actor and singer. His first album was Dai Wela...James ("It's time for James"). He then released Siren Love, Forever James, The Next, James Hits Series, and James F. M.. His bestselling albums include Siren Love and James F. M., and popular singles include: "Khon raek" (: "First One"), "Khao man kai" (ข้าวมันไก่; "Hainanese chicken rice"), and "Mai aht bplian jai" (ไม่อาจเปลี่ยนใจ; "I Shouldn't Change Your Mind").

Early life
Loychusak was born into a Thai Chinese family on 9 March 1978 in Nakhon Si Thammarat, southern Thailand.

Career 
He entered the music business in 1995 when he released his first studio album Dai Wela...James with RS Promotion, yielding successful results. He is considered one of the teen stars in Thailand's 1990s music scene, alongside contemporary teen stars such as Patiparn "Moss" Pataweekarn, Sornram "Num" Teppitak, Somchai "Tao" Khemklad, Suttida "Nook" Kasemsan na Ayudhya, Lift&Oil, Raptor, and Tata Young.

He was a taekwondo practitioner, and starred in the February 1997 action film Gangster Boys, directed by Ricky Loo and produced by Five Star Production.

On 11 December 1998, Loychusak survived the crash of Thai Airways International Flight 261. The press therefore nicknamed him "Iron Bones Singer" or "James, The Iron Bones". 

He became popular again as Knight Mask (Nah Kak Atsawin) in season two of The Mask Singer.

He is a franchise owner of Hainanese chicken rice, which his family started in Nakhon Si Thammarat.

Discography

RS Promotion
 Dai Wela...James (It's time for James)
 Siren Love
 Forever James
 James F.M.
 James Delivery
 James Hits Series
 James Festival
 James Clinic
 James Alive
 James Zapp Story

Various albums 
 Superteens
 The Next
 The X-Venture

GMM Grammy 
 Now James

Concert
 RS Meeting

Filmography

Films
 Gangster Boys (The Gang)
 CCJ
 Home
 Jandara 1
 Jandara 2

Television
Insee Daeng (superhero series aired on Channel 7 adapted from a namesake film in 60s and 70s starred Mitr Chaibancha)
Boon Pong (mini series, Boonpong Sirivejjabhandu's biography aired on Thai PBS)
 Susankhonpen (drama, horror series aired on Channel 7)
 Penkhao
Sri Ayodhaya (special series to glorify the Kings in the Ayutthaya period presented and aired on TrueVisions)

References

1978 births
Living people
Ruangsak Loychusak
Ruangsak Loychusak
Ruangsak Loychusak
Ruangsak Loychusak
Ruangsak Loychusak
Ruangsak Loychusak
Ruangsak Loychusak
Ruangsak Loychusak
Ruangsak Loychusak
Survivors of aviation accidents or incidents
Ruangsak Loychusak